Yevhen Hutsol (Ukrainian: Євген Гуцол; born 13 May 1990) is a Ukrainian athlete specialising in the 400 and 800 metres. He represented his country in the 4 × 400 metres relay at the 2013 World Championships, as well as two indoor World Championships in 2012 and 2014. His biggest individual success is the fifth place at the 2015 European Indoor Championships.

His personal bests in the 400 metres are 45.89 outdoors (Erzurum 2017) and 46.72 seconds indoors (Sumy 2015). His personal bests in the 800 metres are 1:46.56 outdoors (Kropyvnytskiy 2018) and 1:47:66 indoors (Ostrava 2021).

Competition record

References

All-Athletics profile

1990 births
Living people
Ukrainian male sprinters
Ukrainian male middle-distance runners
World Athletics Championships athletes for Ukraine
Athletes (track and field) at the 2019 European Games
European Games medalists in athletics
European Games gold medalists for Ukraine
Ukrainian Athletics Championships winners
Competitors at the 2017 Summer Universiade
20th-century Ukrainian people
21st-century Ukrainian people